Novo Konjarevo is a village in the municipality of Novo Selo, North Macedonia. It is located close to the Bulgarian border.

Demographics
According to the 2002 census, the village had a total of 934 inhabitants. Ethnic groups in the village include:

Macedonians 932
Serbs 2

References

Villages in Novo Selo Municipality
Bulgaria–North Macedonia border crossings